The 2016–17 Iraqi Premier League was the 43rd season of the Iraqi Premier League, the highest division for Iraqi association football clubs, since its establishment in 1974. The season started on 15 September 2016, and ended on 10 August 2017.

Al-Quwa Al-Jawiya won their sixth Premier League title, finishing four points ahead of second-placed Al-Naft and losing just one game throughout the campaign. It was the club's first league title since the 2004–05 season, and their manager Basim Qasim became the first manager to win titles in two consecutive seasons with two different teams.

Teams

Twenty teams were to compete in the league – the top eighteen teams from the previous season, as well as two teams promoted from the Iraq Division One. However, Erbil withdrew from the league after 12 rounds, so nineteen teams completed the season.

Al-Hussein were promoted as the leaders of the final stage after drawing 1–1 against Brayati on 19 July 2016, at Al-Shaab Stadium, to appear for the first time in their history in the Iraqi Premier League. Al-Bahri were promoted, to appear for the seventh time in the Iraqi Premier League (the first since 1990–91), as the runners-up after drawing with Al-Sinaat Al-Kahrabaiya 2–2 on the same day at Al-Karkh Stadium. They replace Duhok, who withdrew from the last season, and Al-Sinaa.

Stadia and locations

League table

Results

Season statistics

Top scorers

Hat-tricks

Notes
4 Player scored 4 goals

Awards

See also
2016–17 Iraq FA Cup

References

External links
 Iraq Football Association

Iraqi Premier League seasons
1
Iraq